The 2018 Malaysia Open (officially known as the Celcom Axiata Malaysia Open 2018 for sponsorship reasons) was a badminton tournament which took place at Axiata Arena in Malaysia from 26 June to 1 July 2018 and had a total purse of $700,000.

Tournament
The 2018 Malaysia Open was the eleventh tournament of the 2018 BWF World Tour and also part of the Malaysia Open championships, which had been held since 1937. This tournament was organized by the Badminton Association of Malaysia with the sanction of the BWF. It was also the first ever new Super 750 Level 3 tournament of the BWF World Tour schedule.

Venue
This international tournament was held at the Axiata Arena in Kuala Lumpur, Malaysia.

Point distribution
Below is the point distribution for each phase of the tournament based on the BWF points system for the BWF World Tour Super 750 event.

Prize money
The total prize money for this tournament was US$700,000. Distribution of prize money was in accordance with BWF regulations.

Men's singles

Seeds

 Viktor Axelsen (quarter-finals)
 Son Wan-ho (second round)
 Shi Yuqi (quarter-finals)
 Srikanth Kidambi (semi-finals)
 Chen Long (first round)
 Chou Tien-chen (quarter-finals)
 Lee Chong Wei (champion)
 Prannoy Kumar (withdrew)

Finals

Top half

Section 1

Section 2

Bottom half

Section 3

Section 4

Women's singles

Seeds

 Tai Tzu-ying (champion)
 Akane Yamaguchi (quarter-finals)
 P. V. Sindhu (semi-finals)
 Ratchanok Intanon (semi-finals)
 Chen Yufei (first round)
 Carolina Marín (quarter-finals)
 Sung Ji-hyun (second round)
 He Bingjiao (final)

Finals

Top half

Section 1

Section 1

Bottom half

Section 3

Section 4

Men's doubles

Seeds

 Marcus Fernaldi Gideon / Kevin Sanjaya Sukamuljo (quarter-finals)
 Mathias Boe / Carsten Mogensen (first round)
 Liu Cheng / Zhang Nan (second round)
 Li Junhui / Liu Yuchen (semi-finals)
 Mads Conrad-Petersen / Mads Pieler Kolding (first round)
 Takeshi Kamura / Keigo Sonoda (champions)
 Takuto Inoue / Yuki Kaneko (second round)
 Fajar Alfian / Muhammad Rian Ardianto (second round)

Finals

Top half

Section 1

Section 2

Bottom half

Section 3

Section 4

Women's doubles

Seeds

 Chen Qingchen / Jia Yifan (final)
 Yuki Fukushima / Sayaka Hirota (second round)
 Kamilla Rytter Juhl / Christinna Pedersen (second round)
 Shiho Tanaka / Koharu Yonemoto (second round)
 Misaki Matsutomo / Ayaka Takahashi (champions)
 Lee So-hee / Shin Seung-chan (second round)
 Jongkolphan Kititharakul / Rawinda Prajongjai (quarter-finals)
 Della Destiara Haris / Rizki Amelia Pradipta (semi-finals)

Finals

Top half

Section 1

Section 2

Bottom half

Section 3

Section 1

Mixed doubles

Seeds

 Tontowi Ahmad / Liliyana Natsir (quarter-finals)
 Wang Yilü / Huang Dongping (final)
 Tang Chun Man / Tse Ying Suet (quarter-finals)
 Zheng Siwei / Huang Yaqiong (champions)
 Zhang Nan / Li Yinhui (second round)
 Mathias Christiansen / Christinna Pedersen (first round)
 Goh Soon Huat / Shevon Jemie Lai (first round)
 He Jiting / Du Yue (quarter-finals)

Finals

Top half

Section 1

Section 2

Bottom half

Section 3

Section 4

References

External links
 Tournament link

Malaysia Open (badminton)
Malaysia Open
Malaysia Open
Malaysia Open